Shannon Reynolds (born 3 January 1995) is an Australian canoeist. She qualified to represent Australia at the 2020 Summer Olympics. Her team consisting of Jo Brigden-Jones, Catherine McArthur, and Jaime Roberts made the women's K-4 final but failed to win a medal, coming 7th with a time of 1:39.797 over two seconds slower than their best time in the heats.

Early years 
From an early age it could be seen that Reynolds had the physical attributes of a kayaker. When she was 14 years-of-age she became a member of the Bayswater Paddle Club. She was very dedicated and trained on the water and at the gym.

Reynolds represented Australia at the 2013 Australian Youth Olympic Festival. Later that year she represented Australia at the Junior World Championships. Reynolds finished eighth as part of Australia's K-4 500 crew.

Achievements 
Reynolds was selected for Australia's Under 23 World Championships team and competed in 2014, 2015 and 2017.

Reynolds managed to finish fifth in the women's K1 500 at the 2020 Australian Canoe Sprint Championships and therefore qualified for the Tokyo 2020 Olympics..   

Reynolds is trained in nursing and midwifery and works as a first aid officer at a local high school.

References 

1995 births
Living people
Australian female canoeists
Olympic canoeists of Australia
Canoeists at the 2020 Summer Olympics
Sportswomen from Western Australia
21st-century Australian women